Henry Johnson (December 2, 1854March 5, 1941) was a Danish American immigrant, farmer, logger, businessman, and Republican politician.  He was the 18th State Treasurer of Wisconsin, serving ten years from 1913 to 1923, and earlier served six years as a member of the Wisconsin State Assembly, representing Oconto County.

Biography
Johnson was born at Amendrup near Præstø, Denmark, on December 2, 1854. In 1873 he moved to Oshkosh, Wisconsin, where he remained until 1879. He then bought land in the town of How, Wisconsin, to which he moved and engaged in farming and logging. He also operated a warehouse and real estate business in the nearby village of Suring. He was the chairman of the town board and town treasurer for a number of years. He married Augusta Ernestina Dieck (1858–1924) on June 18, 1879.

Johnson died on March 5, 1941, in Madison, Wisconsin.

References

External links

Farmers from Wisconsin
Businesspeople from Wisconsin
People from Oconto County, Wisconsin
State treasurers of Wisconsin
Mayors of places in Wisconsin
Wisconsin city council members
1854 births
1941 deaths
American loggers
Danish emigrants to the United States
Burials in Wisconsin
People from Vordingborg Municipality
Republican Party members of the Wisconsin State Assembly